Ardnaree Sarsfields GAA is a Gaelic football club located in Ballina, County Mayo. The club competes in competitions organized by Mayo GAA county board and is a member of the North division.

History
The club was founded in 1949.

Honours
Mayo Junior Football Championship: 1952, 1959, 1971, 2015
North Mayo Football Championship: 1949, 1950, 1952, 1957, 1958, 1959, 1964, 1966, 1969, 1971, 1979, 2008, 2009, 2010
 Connacht Junior Club Football Championship Winners: 2015
 All-Ireland Junior Club Football Championship: Runners-Up 2016

Notable players
Joe Corcoran played with Ardnaree Sarsfields with great distinction and for many is the most recognised former player. Joe Corcoran won 2 county junior titles with Ardnaree Sarsfields (1959 and 1971) and a national football league title with Mayo in 1970. Joe Corcoran was the long-time record scorer for the Mayo senior team with 19-360 (417 points) until 2012 when Conor Mortimer surpassed his total. Joe Corcoran also served as a Club President, manager and selector over his years of service to Ardnaree Sarsfields. Known as "Jinking Joe".

John Forde -  Double All-Ireland Senior Football winner with Mayo 1950 and 1951. John Forde also served as Club President for Ardnaree Sarsfields.

Fr. Peter Quinn - Double All-Ireland Senior Football winner with Mayo 1950 and 1951

References

External links

Gaelic games clubs in County Mayo